Broadcast Film Critics Association Awards 1999 may refer to:

 4th Critics' Choice Awards, the fourth Critics' Choice Awards ceremony that took place in 1999
 5th Critics' Choice Awards, the fifth Critics' Choice Awards ceremony that took place in 2000 and which honored the best in film for 1999